BYG can refer to:

 Bang Yong Guk, acronym and stage name of the South Korean rapper.
 BYG Actuel, a record label
 BYG•DTU, the Department of Civil Engineering at the Technical University of Denmark.